"Lime Rickey" is a song recorded by Canadian country music artist George Fox. It was released in 1990 as the third single from his second studio album, With All My Might. It peaked at number 10 on the RPM Country Tracks chart in August 1990.

Chart performance

References

1989 songs
1990 singles
George Fox songs
Warner Music Group singles
Songs written by George Fox (singer)